Nicholas Bacon may refer to:
 Sir Nicholas Bacon (Lord Keeper) (1510–1579), English politician during the reign of Queen Elizabeth I, Lord Keeper of the Great Seal
 Sir Nicholas Bacon, 1st Baronet, of Redgrave (c. 1540–1624), his son, the first man created a baronet
 Sir Nicholas Bacon, 1st Baronet, of Gillingham (1623–1666), English lawyer
 Sir Nicholas Bacon, 14th Baronet (born 1953), Premier Baronet of England, lawyer, and Page of Honour to Queen Elizabeth II
 Nicholas Bacon (Ipswich MP) (1622–1687), M.P. for Ipswich, 1685–1687